Amoda is a small village in the Jalgaon District of Maharashtra, India. It is on 
Bhusawal-Raver road. It is 5 km from faizpur & Just 13 km from Bhusawal railway junction.

The village population is around 6000. The people living in the  village are various communities such as  Leva Patil, kolis, navis, Buddhist, pavari, pinjari and tadavi.

Here, 95% of the people depend  on  banana  and sugarcane farms. In Amode two primary schools and one higher secondary school are available for education.

References

Villages in Jalgaon district